Armenian theater dates to before Roman times and is one of the oldest Eurasian theatrical traditions.

History
The Armenian Theatre has its roots in the theatre of Ancient Greece, and it was a natural development of ancient religious rituals, when hired professional gusans (troubadours), sang the praises of the nobleman's ancestors in lengthy verses. Singers of lamentations or tragedians were known as voghbergus, and those participating in festive ceremonies were called katakagusan (Comedians).

The history of the Armenian Real Theater begins at about 70 BC. According to Plutarch, the first historically known theatre in Armenia was built during the reign of Tigran the Great. In Dikranagert he opened a great public theatre in 69 B.C., fourteen years before Pompey's first public theatre in Rome.
 
Tigran's son, Artavazd II, wrote several Greek tragedies, orations, and historical commentaries which survived until the second century A.D. Artavazd built the second permanent public theatre of Armenia in the old capital of Artashat. The tragedies of Euripides and the comedies of Menander were regularly produced there. He is considered the first Armenian playwright and director of Classical Armenian Theatre. Plutarch mentions that the Bacchae of Euripides, directed by Artavazd, was presented there in 53 B.C. 
 
Great advances in every field followed the translation of the Bible (410 AD), including the theatre. But the advances Armenian culture came to an abrupt halt in the seventh century when the Arab invasion slowed all progress. Although a cultural decline existed during the eighth and ninth centuries, the theatre held on and survived. Armenian historians of the era indicate its living presence. Archeological excavations made in the fort of Kaitzun Bert in Lori have uncovered numerous statues of actors and masks of animals and birds, which confirm the descriptions given by historians.
 
During the eleventh through fourteenth centuries, the Armenian theatre continued to improve and enhance its dramatic styles in the Armenian-Cilicia area. The Mime Theatre cleansed itself of erotic excesses, the Tragic Theatre was enriched by employing topics from the epics, and the Comic Theatre satirized the social classes.
 
A decline began with the fall of the last independent Armenian kingdom, the Lusignan dynasty of Cilicia in 1375. Various theatre groups scattered all over Asia Minor, going to autonomous Armenian provinces. Charden, a French world traveller, in his Les Mimes de l'Orient, gives a detailed description of a performance he attended at the Armenian Mime Theatre in Yerevan, Armenia, in 1664. At that time Armenia was under Persian rule. Chardin's account reveals that the Goussan tradition was still alive with mime action, accompanied by music, singing and dancing, similar to opera.
 
In the eighteenth century, original plays and translations of European plays were published in Classical Armenian. They only attracted a secular audience, and as a result they were seldom performed, but were used in schools in the study of classical Armenian. Plays were written by the resident clergy and performed by the students. The pioneer efforts of the Mekhitarists provided a significant step in the development of the Western Armenian Theatre.
 
In 1855, the first western Armenian amateur theatre group was established by Srabion Hek'imian, and a year later, Beshigtashlian organized a group of amateurs who performed at the Lusavochian School. Their success led to the construction of new school auditoriums and theatres in various parts of Constantinople. Turks, whose introduction to Armenian theatre was at the homes of their Armenian friends, soon saw Armenian actors on Turkish stages as well. It is believed that Armenians played a principal part in the birth of contemporary Turkish Theatre.
 
Dramatists of the late nineteenth century set a strong precedent for those who followed. Major dramatists forged ahead with new styles and early traces of a new vernacular. Bedros Tourian (1852–1872), is credited with freeing Armenian classicism to the vernacular usage. In spite of his short life span, he wrote at least 10 plays and several poems, some of which have been lost in a fire.
 
The foremost satirist of the Armenian stage is Hagop Baronian. From a poor family with a minimal education, Baronian's brilliance enabled him to master several languages, reading the classics in Greek, French and Italian. His most famous plays are Brother Balthazar, The Honorable Beggars, and Abisoghom Agha. Like Molière, he satirizes human greed, vanity and hypocrisy, using his wit with devastating effect.
 
The most significant Western Armenian classical dramatist was Levon Shant (1869–1952), whose creative outpour spanned half a century with short stories, poems, essays, text-books and plays. (1869–1952) He was a diplomat and an educator, but his real fame rests on his powerful dramatic works. Shant was born in Istanbul and received his early education in Turkey. Later he studied at the Gevorgian Jemaran (academy) in Ejmiatsin, and at universities in Jena, Leipzig and Munich. Shant survived the genocide of the Armenians by the Ottoman Turks, because he was teaching in the Caucasus at the time. His most popular plays are: Ancient Gods, (1909) The Emperor, (1914), The Chained (1918), The Princess of the Fallen Castle, (1921), and Oshin Payl (1929). Like Shakespeare's chronicle plays drawn from English history, Shant's most popular plays chronicle crucial periods of Armenian history. He is the first Armenian dramatist to use expressionism and to expertly draw from mythology and blend it with realism, as illustrated in Ancient Gods. With the establishment of Soviet Rule in Armenia, Shant lived in exile in France, Iran, Egypt and Lebanon. When Lebanon became his permanent residence, he and his friend of Jemaran days, Nikol Aghbalian, founded the Armenian Jemaran of Beirut, where he was president for twenty years. In 1930, he helped the famed actor-director, Caspar Ipekian, in the formation of Beirut's first Armenian Theatre Group. In 1941, Shant again assisted Caspar Ipekian in the formation of the first permanent Theatrical Society in the Diaspora, known as the Casper Ipekian Hamazkayin Taderakhumb (The Caspar Ipekian National Theatre Group), and its first production was Shant's The Princess of the Fallen Castle. Shant's plays became a regular part of its repertory from 1942 until his death in 1951, when he was given a national burial in Beirut.
 
The Armenians of the Caucasus enjoyed a greater freedom to develop their arts than did the Armenians in the Ottoman Empire during the early twentieth century. As a result, the development of Eastern Armenian Drama found its way in the Caucasus under different circumstances. Its founder, Harutyun Alamdaryan, organized an amateur theatrical group in Tiflis in 1834 and staged several European plays. His student, Khachadour Abovian, wrote the first play of the modern eastern Armenian dialect, Aghchegan Sera, (The Girl's Love), and it was performed by the group. Another student of Alamdarian, Galoust Shermazarian, wrote a satirical play, Karapet Episcoposi Ararknera (The Deeds of Bishop Karapet). After its performance, he had to flee the country because he had offended the clergy and government officials with its hilarious jabs at both institutions. In 1860, Gevorg Chimushgian organized a professional theatrical group in the Caucasus. Modern Armenian theatres were built in Tiflis, Baku, Nor Nakhichevan, Alexandropol, Kars and Yerevan. In less than twenty-five years, Armenian writers produced plays of literary and artistic value. It was a varied repertoire of original works and quality translations of European masterpieces.
 
The greatest Eastern Armenian playwright of the late nineteenth century was Gabriel Sundukian (1825–1912). Sundukian was born in Tiflis, and as a result of his studies in France and Russia, he learned French, Italian and Russian, as well as classical and modern Armenian. A brilliant man of letters, his plays offer a broad scope of human nature, its frailties and virtues. He was the first dramatist to deal with the Armenian middle and lower classes, and his play Pepo is among the most widely performed plays in Armenia. In 1921 the first state theatre was founded in Yerevan, Armenia and named the Sundukian Theatre, in his honor, His other major works include Embarrassment, Sneezing at Night is a Good Omen, The Husbands, Love and Freedom. Derenik Demirchian (1877–1956) and Alexander Shirvanzade (1858–1935) were playwrights who were already famous before the Communist take-over of Armenia. They stayed in Armenia and continued their creative work there for the rest of their lives. Demirchyan, a contemporary of Levon Shant, was a prolific novelist, poet and playwright. His most popular play, Nazar the Brave (Kaj Nazar, 1923), satirizes bourgeois morality and has been adapted very successfully to film. Alexander Shirvanzade, like his counterparts, wrote in many genres. His plays expose a society dominated by greed, superstition and hypocrisy, demonstrating a deep concern for truth and justice. His plays, Chaos, Namus, Evil Spirit, and For the Sake of Honor are still widely performed. His masterful use of realism pervades the conflicting issues in the drama For the Sake of Honor.
 
Soon after the Sundukian Theatre gained stature, many prominent actors from abroad, including those whose reputations had flourished in Western Armenia, went to Yerevan to join its repertory. They contributed to notable advances in its repertory, which included Armenian plays and translations of classical, European and American plays. Its modern repertoire is richly diverse with offerings of Armenian translations of world famous dramatists.
 
Actors whose laurels included outstanding portrayals of Shakespearean characters were Petros Adamian and Vahram Papazian. Adamian's specialty was the role of Hamlet, which he portrayed on the Russian and French stages in the Armenian language. Vahram Papazian is reputed to have played Othello 3,000 times in the Armenian, Russian and French languages. Papazian was a native of Istanbul and lived the second half of his life in Soviet Armenia (1888–1968).
 
The "breeches" trend (actresses playing men's roles) infiltrated the Armenian Theatre when the actress Siranush (1857–1932) played the role of Hamlet in 1902. She played European and Armenian roles, as well as other Shakespearean roles, but her portrayals of Hamlet were a recurring part of her repertoire throughout her thirty-year reign on the Armenian stage. Her career on the Armenian stage lasted longer than that of any other Armenian actress. She and Vahram Papazian performed in Levon Shant's The Emperor in 1916 when it first appeared on the Tiflis stage. Papazian played Ohan Gourgen and she played the role of Theophano.
 
Soon after England had established a Shakespeare Foundation, a Shakespeare Center at the Institute of Arts was established in Yerevan, Armenia. Since the 1850s there have been at least 50 translators of Shakespearean drama, but to this day the translator whose excellence is still unmatched is the Iranian-born, Paris-educated career diplomat, Hovaness Massehian (1864–1932). In addition to Armenian, he was fluent in English, French, Persian, Russian, German, Arabic and Turkish. His earliest translation was of Hamlet in 1894, and during the years that followed, he translated Romeo and Juiet, The Merchant of Venice, Othello and Macbeth. When he died even more of his translations were discovered: Much Ado About Nothing, The Tempest, Julius Caesar, and Coriolanius. Massehian was a rare individual who served as Iranian ambassador to London and to Berlin during his career in government service.
 
During the early twentieth century, productions of Shakespearean plays were performed by the Armenian Art Theatre in New York under the direction of Hovaness Zarifian until 1937 when he died. A decade later, Elia Kimatian, a former actor of the Zarifian group, directed and staged The Merchant of Venice in New York City with the Armenian Youth Federation's Theatrical Group which he had organized. He formed the group in the early 1940s and had a series of successes until the mid-1960s.

A major source of Armenian intellectuals in the historic past of Armenia have been works of William Shakespeare.

References

Further reading
"Armenia". 
 The introduction provides an overview of the historical development of Armenian theater.

External links 
A Brief History of Armenian Theatre By Dr. Anne T. Vardanian
SHAKESPEARE AND THE ARMENIAN THEATRE By Nishan Parlakian
Toasting Shakespeare in Armenia